Warwick Murray PhD, FNZGS, DNZG (born 1972) is a New Zealand academic and musician.

Academic career 
Murray graduated from the University of Birmingham in 1993, where he also gained a PhD 1997. He has held academic posts at the University of the South Pacific, and Brunel University (UK). He was appointed professor of human geography and development studies in 2010 at Victoria University of Wellington, New Zealand, which he joined in 2001. He has held sabbatical posts as visiting professor in geography at Cambridge University (UK) (2019, 2022) and Pontifica Universidad Católica de Chile (Chile) (2017) as well as in Latin American studies at Oxford University (UK) (2015).

In 2006, Murray won a New Zealand National Tertiary Teaching Award for Sustained Excellence, and in 2007 the New Zealand Geographical Society (NZGS) President's Award for Teaching Excellence. He was awarded the NZGS President's Award for Excellence in Graduate Supervision in 2015 in recognition of supervision of research on Latin America. In 2019, he won the Distinguished New Zealand Geographer Medal which is the highest honour in New Zealand geography.

As a researcher, Murray has published books, articles, or chapters in the fields of development, rural, and economic geography, focusing especially on Chile and Latin America, as well as the Pacific Islands, the Asia Pacific and New Zealand. He is a commentator on national television and radio on international development issues and Latin American affairs, and is the author of the books Geographies of Globalization and Aid and Development co-authored with Professor John Overton. From 2002-10 and 2016-20, he was the editor-in-chief of the journal Asia Pacific Viewpoint. In 2007 he founded the Victoria Institute for Links with Latin America and has also served as Co-President of the Association of Iberian and Latin American Studies of Australasia and President of the Council for Latin American Studies of Asia and Oceania. He was Vice-President of the New Zealand Geographical Society (2017–19) and President (2020-21).

Personal life 
Born in Edgbaston, Birmingham and raised in Hereford, England, where he graduated from the local Sixth Form College.

Murray is a singer-songwriter and multi-instrumentalist. A four-part show featuring original songs he plays in lectures called The Singing Geographer aired on National Radio New Zealand in 2012/13. He records and performs geographical lectures on a Youtube playlist called ‘Georambles’. He has also released five New Zealand top 20 albums both as a soloist and with The Strait Shooters, Funky Jandal, and The Fabulous Murray Brothers. The latter peaked at #6 in the New Zealand Albums Top 20 and at #1 on the New Zealand Heatseeker chart of January 22, 2018 with 'Sing It Chap!'

References 

 Publications

Academic staff of the Victoria University of Wellington
Latin Americanists
1972 births
Living people
Alumni of the University of Birmingham